"Autobiography of a Scalawag" appeared February 19, 1869 on the front page of The Native Virginian, Vol II No. 15.

It has been referenced in the book "White Trash: The 400-year Untold History of Class" by Nancy Isenberg where the author refers to it as "a brilliant piece of Democratic propaganda". It is a brief parody story of John Stubbs' rise to power by lying and cheating and switching sides any time it benefits him.

Text 

The text of "Autobiography of a Scalawag" transcribed from the scanned image found at the Library of Congress:

AUTOBIOGRAPHY OF A SCALAWAG.

I was born in Greene county, going on About forty-odd years ago, having Bin the younffest of 14 children, all of whitch was raised except 6 which dide of the meesles and things. When I was a smart chap my Parents moved to Shifflet's Holler, well known in Albemarle county for sum remarkable murders, in which so fur as I know and Beleav none of our Foax was mixed up.
 
I was as good a suthern man before the war as thar was in our county, and always voted the Democratic ticket as I noad the Whigs was not Sound about the niggers, and my political greed was founded on the Jeffersonian Republican printed by Mr. Alexander on Main st., in Charlottesville near about whar thar now is a very fine Juelry store, and opposite the Flannagin Bank. I jined of a artillery company about the first man, and fit until I lost all taiste for that arjuous life--say nigh on about 12 months. I was wun of the teamsturs, and had a very ruff time amoving from Manassas to Williamsburg, and particularly bak. About this time I got a detale and held a affice in the Confederit stables in Richmond under Mr. Davis during the balance of the Waw. I was in all the Battles around Richmond, working like a dog physiking and cleaning uv horses, and when we phinally got Gineral McClellan in them swormps, I visited some of the hardest fiting places along with my boss--and picked up a good many things.
 
About February, 1865, I became Phully satisfied in my own conshence that I smelt a rat. So wun tolerable clear morning I said, "Confederit stables, adu!" and struck out for the lower Jeems, when met a Yankee transpote. I giv them all the pints, and told them I was a Union man out of Castle Thunder, whar I had suffered for my principles nigh on two years--and having lived very thin--it was pretty rough in Richmond in them days, particularly the Artikkle of whiskey, my emashated condition give a very gud kind uv color to my story, and so they took me in. I noad a gud deal about the phix in Richmond, and so they took me to Ginral Butler whar give me some very good ale and five or six drinks, and axed me questions. I noad things was up, and told him putty much the truth, tho' bein brung up at Shiffllett's, I mout have lide in some things from the fose of habit, and without any particular intenshun uv telling uv a lie to my new friends.
 
Well, you know the final eend, and about that time I was putty sicdy in Washington, whar all the novelty had woan off uv me, except with Mr. Greeley, who always gave me ten cents and axed me for kruelties to the Federal prisoners, which uv course I gived him, some from real life, others hearn, and others to keep up the interest.
 
I cum back to Virginia in 1866, and jined the scalawags, and in 1867 I begun to attend the nigger meetings and tell 'em uv thar wrongs, and what we was gwine to do for them. I become a right good hand at nigger speeking, and went in strong for manhood suffrage, whar I was posted in the Tribune. Phoaxs phoolishly taxt me with being uv rekreunt to my own people, but I seed very plain it war no time to be centimental, a fuling about what was right, fur I noad we was in a revolution, and nobody was agwine to help him who wuddent help himself, so I sot my mind to help myself to sumthing, and if every dog has his day and the niggers was agwine to have theirs, I seed whar the path uv glory was open to John Stubbs.
 
And this is how I got to the kunvention--whar I waded in. We was obliged to stand by the niggers, for the white foax cut us and we wuts dispised until thar wus nuthen left but to fite it out on that line. It wur nesecerry to be more particular in Virginia than in the other States, because the white people was heavy in the majority, and so we shet down on 'em with the artikkle No. three excluding the most malignant rebbels from the ballot, wharby we killed about phifleen thousand uv the best kind uv votes. We cum at 'em then with fixin' uv the Legislature, and give the niggers a clean majority of 21 thar. And then we phixt the counties so as to git the moast of them, and we A lowed about two hundred officers to a county, so as to have enuff for All. But the worst thing they minded was when we give 'em the Test Oath--that was like a Senter shot, and I noad the dog was certinly Hit by the way he howled when we phixt it. It was a little ruff, but it was the only way we had to Kum at 'em.
 
I am now clerk of ---- county, worth, I suppose, by fair dealings $2,500 a year. I hav no Reeson to complain uv Fortune, for she has been a kind friend to me. I may have done some things--Eetin say my peck of dirt--some thing-whar under a more orspicious environsment I mout have not liked, but I never has been able to cee my way kleer without sum side cuts, and as for a life of inflecksible ackrawsy it's not a goin to woak, and I never cee it work. We is scinners, and we must leave a margin if we want to be practikkle. I never could sensher the Kummitty of Nine, because I know Jordan is a hard road to travel, and if they don't stop torking about Honnor, these Southern people will jes let the Yankees eat 'em up.--We mus bend; everything mus bend at times; and whar is thar any exemption for Conshence different from other artikkles, and settin up to fite against Sirkumstances and the Spirrit of the Age?
 
I winst a little at first when I becum a scalawag, meeting uv old acquaintances, but when a man gets up in the world, people is so tolerunt; and thar is so much rascallity now-a-days that particular cases does not ecsite so much Atentlon as wunst upon a time. My censibility, too, is less akute sents I have made the ackwaintance of the fratunity of carpet-baggers, the Right Bower of our party; I hav seed so much unblushing effrontery in these foax that I frekwently feels a glow of conshus virtue when me and they takes a drink. They makes no pertensions to a strict a course of life; but for the original talunt of smartness and getting all you ken I bows to 'em as my betters. They lets out sometimes a feeling for me that borders too near to my taste of contempt; they has indeed told me I was embarlssed by scrupils, which I am whar thar is smarl game, and I suppose is owing to my being born in this part of the world. But I must finish this chapter as I am called off to swar in--a good many is agwIne to jump that fence.--Enq. and Ex.

References 

1869 documents
1869 in Virginia
Parodies